Mamadou Aliou "N'Jo Lea" Keïta (1 January 195211 April 2004) was a Guinean footballer who played as a forward for Hafia and the Guinea national team.

International career
Keïta scored 22 goals in 31 games for the Guinea national team, and as of 26 March 2021 is the 4th highest scorer in the history of the team.  He was the top scorer at the 1976 African Cup of Nations.

Death
Keïta died on 11 November 2004 in Conakry of cardiac arrest.

External links
 RSSSF Profile
 NFT Profile

References

1952 births
2004 deaths
Sportspeople from Conakry
Guinean footballers
Guinea international footballers
Association football forwards
Hafia FC players
Guinée Championnat National players